Firuzabad-e Pacheqa (also Romanized as Fīrūzābād-e Pācheqā and Fīrūzābād Pāchoqā; also known as Fīrūzābād) is a village in Sar Firuzabad Rural District, Firuzabad District, Kermanshah County, Kermanshah Province, Iran. At the 2006 census, its population was 247, in 53 families.

References 

Populated places in Kermanshah County